Play with Fire may refer to:

 Play with Fire (comics), a Buffy the Vampire Slayer comics collection
 "Play with Fire" (CSI), an episode of CSI: Crime Scene Investigation

Music
 Play with Fire (album), by The Reign of Kindo, 2013
 "Play with Fire" (Hilary Duff song), 2006
 "Play with Fire" (Rolling Stones song), 1965
 "Play with Fire", a song by Kendrick Lamar from C4
 "Play with Fire", a song by Nico Santos

See also 
 Playing with Fire (disambiguation)
The Girl Who Played with Fire (2006), the second novel in Stieg Larsson's Millennium series